New York's 32nd State Assembly district is one of the 150 districts in the New York State Assembly in the United States. It has been represented by Democrat Vivian Cook since 1991.

Geography 
District 32 is located in Queens, comprising the neighborhoods of Jamaica, Rochdale, and parts of Richmond Hill and South Ozone Park.

Recent Election Results

2022

2020

2018

2016

2014

2012

References 

32